Makers of Modern India is a non-fiction book written by Indian historian-scholar Ramachandra Guha and published by Penguin India in 2010. The book features profiles of selected personalities that laid the foundation of modern India: Ram Mohan Roy, Syed Ahmad Khan, Khuda Bakhsh, Jotirao Phule, Gopal Krishna Gokhale, Bal Gangadhar Tilak, Tarabai Shinde, Mahatma Gandhi, Rabindranath Tagore, B. R. Ambedkar, Mohammad Ali Jinnah, Periyar , Kamala Devi Chattopadhyay, Jawaharlal Nehru, M. S. Golwalkar, Rammanohar Lohia, Jayaprakash Narayan, C. Rajagopalachari, Verrier Elwin, and Hamid Dalwai.

The book has met with generally positive reviews.

References 

Books about India
2010 non-fiction books
Books about Mahatma Gandhi
Cultural depictions of Muhammad Ali Jinnah
Cultural depictions of B. R. Ambedkar
Cultural depictions of Jawaharlal Nehru
Jyotirao Phule
Bal Gangadhar Tilak
Periyar E. V. Ramasamy
Works about Rabindranath Tagore
Penguin Books India books